John Ellis Roosevelt Estate, also known as Meadow Croft, is a historic estate located at Sayville in Suffolk County, New York.  The main house, roughly L-shaped, is composed of two distinct parts: the original farmhouse, built about 1850, and now the rear of the house; and the larger, more formal Colonial Revival mansion built 1891-1892 and set perpendicular to it.  The original section is a two-story, rectangular farmhouse, sheathed in clapboard and surmounted by a gable roof.  The 1891–92 section is a clapboarded, two-story structure with an elaborate facade with generous porch and surmounted by a steeply pitched, truncated hipped roof.  Also on the property are contributing carriage house, equipment barn, garage, caretaker's cottage, swimming pool, storage hut, and archaeological sites.  The property was purchased by Robert Barnwell Roosevelt (1829–1906) in 1873; his son John Ellis Roosevelt (1853–1939) commissioned the estate.

The estate is located on the grounds of Sans Soucci Lakes County Park, and was added to the National Register of Historic Places in 1987.

The Bayport Blue Point Heritage Association has restored the mansion and offers seasonal tours and exhibits of local history.

References

External links
 Meadow Croft - Bayport Blue Point Heritage Association
Meadowcroft Estate (Suffolk County Department of Parks)

Houses on the National Register of Historic Places in New York (state)
Colonial Revival architecture in New York (state)
Houses completed in 1850
Houses in Suffolk County, New York
Museums in Suffolk County, New York
Historic house museums in New York (state)
National Register of Historic Places in Suffolk County, New York